The 1900 Canadian Amateur Hockey League (CAHL) season was the second season of the league. Teams played an eight-game schedule. Again, the Montreal Shamrocks were the league champion with a record of seven wins and one loss.

League business

Executive 
 F. R. Baird (President)
 J. P. Dickson (1st Vice-President)
 H. E. Scott ( 2nd Vice-President)
 George R. James (Secretary-Treasurer)
 Harry McLaughlin (Councillor)

McGill University applied to join the league but was turned down.

The use of netting for the goal was demonstrated with a model produced by Frank Stocking, goaltender of the Quebec club at the annual meeting. After an exhibition game between the Shamrocks and Victorias, the use of goal nets was approved for league play, and used for the season. The netting connected the two upright posts, but there was no crossbar across the top.

The use of hockey gloves was quite common and shin guards were now mostly in use inside the stockings though some players still used the old style outside the stockings.

Season 
Star rover Graham Drinkwater retired from the Victorias before the season.

Highlights 
The Shamrocks won the championship losing only one game, and that, after the league championship was decided. This was the second year in a row for the Shamrocks, who were a mediocre team before this stretch of success and would return to it the next year.

Final standing

Stanley Cup challenges

Shamrocks vs. Winnipeg 

The MHA's Winnipeg Victorias issued another challenge for the Cup. This time, a best-of-three series was played against the defending champion Montreal Shamrocks. Winnipeg won the first game, 4–3, but Montreal prevailed in the next two games, 3–2 and 5–4.

Shamrocks vs. Halifax 

In March, the Shamrocks then received another challenge for the Cup. However, the Halifax Crescents of the Halifax City Hockey League did not pose much of a threat as Montreal crushed them, 10–2 and 11–0.

Schedule and results 

† Shamrocks clinch league championship.

‡ defaulted to Shamrocks

Player statistics

Goaltending averages 
Note: GP = Games played, GA = Goals against, SO = Shutouts, GAA = Goals against average

Scoring leaders

Stanley Cup engraving

1900 Montreal Shamrocks

See also 
 List of Stanley Cup champions
 Canadian Amateur Hockey League

References 

 
 
 

Canadian Amateur Hockey League seasons
CAHL